The 1911 New Zealand general election was held on Thursday, 7 and 14 December in the general electorates, and on Tuesday, 19 December in the Māori electorates to elect a total of 80 MPs to the 18th session of the New Zealand Parliament. A total number of 590,042 (83.5%) voters turned out to vote. In two seats (Eastern Maori and Gisborne) there was only one candidate (not one seat, as in Wilson).

Outcome
The result was that the Liberal Party, which had won a majority of seats (50 of 80) in Parliament, lost 17 seats and its majority, winning only 33.  The Reform Party gained 9 to obtain a plurality (37) of seats. Liberal Prime Minister Joseph Ward was able to retain office, but in 1912, Reform Party founder William Massey formed a new government.

Joseph Ward hoped to remain in power with the support of independents and Labour Party members. Several candidates before the election made commitments to support the Ward Government in the event of a no-confidence motion in the House of Representatives. Ward considered delaying a new session of the house, perhaps for six months until June 1912, but following some tough talking from the Governor-General John Dickson-Poynder, he set the date as 15 February.
To speed up the negotiating process, Ward promised to resign as Prime Minister after the Reform Party's no-confidence motion was defeated. The end result was even at 39 all, with the Speaker casting the deciding vote in favour of the Ward Government. Joseph Ward then resigned as Prime Minister on 28 March 1912. He was succeeded by Thomas Mackenzie and his new Cabinet was sworn in. The Mackenzie Government lasted only two months and was defeated by a no-confidence motion, 41 votes to 33 on 5 July 1912.

The Second Ballot Act 1908 provided for second or runoff ballots between the top two candidates where the top candidate did not get an absolute majority. The second ballot was held seven days after the first ballot except in ten large rural seats, where fourteen days was allowed. At the 1911 election, all 30 second ballots were held seven days later. Two 1913 by-elections (Grey and Lyttelton) also required second ballots.

The Second Ballot Act did not apply to the Maori electorates, and was used only in 1908 and 1911, as it was repealed in 1913.

In 1911 were the first triennial national referendum on prohibition of alcohol. Referendums were subsequently held in conjunction with each general election (except for 1931 and 1951) until they were abolished in 1989.

Summary of results

Party totals

Votes summary

Results
The following are the results of the 1911 general election:

Key

|-
 |colspan=8 style="background-color:#FFDEAD" | General electorates
|-

|-
 |colspan=8 style="background-color:#FFDEAD" | Māori electorates
|-

|}
Table footnotes:

Summary of changes
A boundary redistribution resulted in the abolition of four electorates:
, held by Thomas Buxton
, held by Edward Newman
, held by Thomas Mackenzie
, held by Robert Scott
, held by John Luke

At the same time, four new electorates came into being:
, first formed through the 1911 electoral redistribution
, previously abolished in 1870
, first formed through the 1911 electoral redistribution
, first formed through the 1911 electoral redistribution
, first formed through the 1911 electoral redistribution

Notes

References